Dr Michael Schluter CBE (born 1947), is "a social thinker, social entrepreneur and founder of Britain's Relationships Foundation." After his Ph.D. from Cornell University (USA), he worked as an applied economist with the International Food Policy Research Institute (IFPRI), and in assignments for the World Bank. With colleagues, he has founded many different organisations in different fields of endeavour. He is currently President and CEO of Relational Peacebuilding Initiatives. In recognition of his public service, he was appointed CBE by the Queen in the New Year Honours List 2009.

A Post-Capitalist and Post-Socialist Approach to Public Policy 

Schluter’s approach to public policy was first articulated at book length in The R Factor(1993), co-authored with the writer, David Lee.

The central argument of the book is that social, economic and political problems in society arise from a lack of prioritization of relationships – not only personal, but organisational, national and international. All legislation, government and corporate policies and organisational structures impact on the way people relate, but this impact is generally not considered by those making policy decisions.

Improvement in the quality of relationships is not only necessary but also possible – and if we can enable relational restoration to happen, the quality of life globally can be significantly enhanced. The overall approach can be considered as a critique of Capitalism as well as Socialism, and provides an alternative framework for public policy. Its followers are sometimes called ‘Relationists’ and, the idea is  commonly referred to as Relational Thinking.

The R Factor was received by many people as a call to action. Even though Schluter has co-authored other books and reports since then (e.g. The Jubilee Manifesto, The Relational Manager, Transforming Capitalism from Within, The Relational Lens, and Confederal Europe), few publications by any author in the last few decades have had its range of impact on individuals, on families, on organisations, and on structures.

Relational Thinking

Schluter has founded two organizations which research relationships, Relationships Foundation and Relational Research. A number of practical and more specific initiatives based on the relational approach have developed out of his work. These include Credit Action to help tackle the effects of consumer debt, which subsequently became part of the Money Charity; Allia which tackles unemployment and funding of social enterprise through encouraging the use of capital to achieve social outcomes; and Relational Schools which seeks to reform the culture and values in schools. Another initiative which has grown out of this approach has been the Marriage Foundation, which promotes long-term committed relationship through the institution of marriage.  

The R Factor sets out the five essential dimensions of any and every relationship (personal, organisational or international). Those dimensions are collectively referred to as the Relational Proximity Framework. Schluter recognised that measurement of quality of relationships was crucial if relational assessment was to be used in public decision making. In an organisational context, any relationship measurement must be two-sided, because, to state the obvious, no relationship is one-sided. The measurement process and tools are referred to as “relational analytics”. Given the tens of thousands of measurements that have been carried out already across schools, companies, the health sector, prisons, elderly care, and the non-profit sector, it has been possible to have the relational analytics tools statistically validated.

International Peace Work

In 1987 Schluter with colleagues initiated a peace process under the name Newick Park Initiative (NPI) in South Africa, which held deliberately low-profile conferences between 1987 and 1997, bringing together the leaders of the African National Congress (ANC) and the White political leadership to discuss key issues so as to ease the path to a political settlement. NPI’s director facilitated Inkatha joining the South African election just three weeks before the first free elections in 1994.

The work in South Africa led on to a peace initiative in Rwanda after the genocide there, followed by a peace process between North and South Sudan. These initiatives were followed by the establishment in 2005 of Concordis International, for regional peace initiatives working primarily in Africa.  In 2016, Schluter helped to establish Relational Peacebuilding Initiatives (RPI) based in Geneva to heal relationships in situations of national conflict; RPI is currently involved with a peacebuilding initiative in the Korean Peninsula, and is  publishing in 2022 a major book on how to bring together a Capitalist and Socialist society to bring about peace in Korea and reunification of the Korean peninsula.

Jubilee Centre and Keep Sunday Special Campaign 

In 1983 Schluter helped to establish the Jubilee Centre to explore the shared heritage of Jewish and Christian understanding of the Torah as a part of the Hebrew/Old Testament Scriptures. Ten years later, this led to the publication of The 'R' Factor in 1993. The intellectual work initiated by The ‘R’ Factor continues in research undertaken by the Jubilee Centre, and through the Cambridge Papers, over 120 of which have now been published. The Jubilee Centre connects what is now referred to as Relational Thinking to the life of churches; it can also be connected to synagogues, mosques, gurudwaras and temples, but that awaits initiative from concerned individuals and groups.  

In 1985, the Jubilee Centre brought together a coalition of retailers, trade unions and church-related organizations to fight Prime Minister Thatcher’s bill to deregulate Sunday trading. This was in recognition that the Sabbath in the Torah in one simple law protected community and family relationships because time is an essential precondition to build and maintain any relationship. The “Keep Sunday Special Campaign” overturned a large government majority. In 1994, the government passed a bill which allows large shops to open for six hours on Sunday while small shops can open when they like; this remains the law to this day. Schluter has continued to speak out against Sunday Trading, arguing that a new law needs to be brought in to give everyone a shared day off  and to ensure parents are able to spend time with their children. Dr. Schluter argued that Sunday shopping in the United States was ''a fairly major contributing factor damaging to family life and stability there,'' and said he was fighting the battle against it here ''on grounds of Christian principle.''

Books (authored or co-authored) 

The “R” Factor (Hodder & Stoughton, 1993)
The Jubilee Manifesto (IVP, 2005)
The Relational Manager (Lion Hudson, 2009)
Transforming Capitalism from Within (2011)
After Capitalism (2013)
The Relational Lens (CUP, 2017)
Confederal Europe Parts 1 and 2 (Sallux and Jubilee Centre, 2018 and 2019)
Relational Rights (Relational Research, 2021)
Is Corporate Capitalism the best we've got to offer? (Relational Research, 2022)
No Other Way to Peace in Korea? A practical path to reunification (Relational Peacebuilding Initiatives, 2022)

References

External links
Jubilee Centre
Relationships Foundation
Relational Peacebuilding Initiatives
Relational Research
The Relationist
Relational Analytics

1947 births
Living people
British economics writers
21st-century British economists
Peacebuilding